The Noah Brooks Tavern is a historic American Revolutionary War site associated with the revolution's first battle, the 1775 battles of Lexington and Concord. It stands, on the site of a previous home, on North Great Road in Lincoln, Massachusetts, just south of the former Battle Road, in an area known as Brooks Village. It is one of eleven houses within the Minute Man National Historic Park that still exists today.

History
The original home was inherited by Thomas Brooks from his father Noah Sr. around 1726. It was on ten acres, and included a barn.

The tavern building that stands on the site today was built in the 1790s by Noah Jr., Thomas' grandson.

The tavern passed through different owners until it ceased functioning in the 1830s. It was sold to Samuel Hartwell in 1857.

Battles of Lexington and Concord

The battles of Lexington and Concord took form before dawn on April 19, 1775. Soldiers passed north of the house on their way to Concord, and again on their way back to Boston.

References

Residential buildings completed in the 18th century
Brooks Tavern, Noah
Massachusetts in the American Revolution
18th-century establishments in Massachusetts
Minute Man National Historical Park